Kavion Pippen (born October 15, 1996) is an American professional basketball player for the Long Island Nets of the NBA G League. He played college basketball for the Southern Illinois Salukis.

College career
Pippen played college basketball for the Southern Illinois Salukis from 2017 to 2019. For those two seasons with the Salukis, Pippen averaged 12.4 points, 5.8 rebounds and 1.7 blocks per game.

Professional career

Austin Spurs (2019–2020)
After going undrafted in the 2019 NBA draft, Pippen signed with the Golden State Warriors on October 7. He was waived by the Warriors on October 19 after appearing in four pre-season games where he averaged 2.5 points and 2.3 rebounds. On October 26, 2019, the Austin Spurs acquired the returning right for Pippen from the Santa Cruz Warriors for the player rights to Isaiah Reese, who was selected in the 2019 NBA G League Draft by the 6th overall draft pick, and a 2020 second round pick. On January 25, 2020, Pippen had 15 points and 6 rebounds in a 119-109 loss to the Memphis Hustle.

Al Sadd (2021)
On January 26, 2021, it was reported that Al Sadd of the Qatari Basketball League had inked Pippen.

Étoile Sportive de Radès (2021)
On March 1 it was reported that Étoile Sportive de Radès of the Championnat National A had signed with Pippen.

Real Valladolid (2021–2022)
On August 13, 2021, Pippen signed with Real Valladolid Baloncesto of the LEB Oro.

Long Island Nets (2022–present)
On November 4, 2022, Pippen was named to the opening night roster for the Long Island Nets.

Personal life
Pippen is the nephew of Hall of Famer Scottie Pippen and cousin of volleyball player Taylor Pippen. His other cousin is American professional basketball player Scotty Pippen Jr., who currently plays for the Los Angeles Lakers of the NBA on a two-way contract with the South Bay Lakers of the NBA G League.

References

External links
Kavion Pippen at ESPN.com
Kavion Pippen at Southern Illinois Salukis

1996 births
Living people
American men's basketball players
Austin Spurs players
Basketball players from Arkansas
CB Valladolid players
Centers (basketball)
Junior college men's basketball players in the United States
People from Hamburg, Arkansas
Southern Illinois Salukis men's basketball players